Chytridiomycota are a division of zoosporic organisms in the kingdom Fungi, informally known as chytrids. The name is derived from the Ancient Greek , meaning "little pot", describing the structure containing unreleased zoöspores. Chytrids are one of the earliest diverging fungal lineages, and their membership in kingdom Fungi is demonstrated with chitin cell walls, a posterior whiplash flagellum, absorptive nutrition, use of glycogen as an energy storage compound, and synthesis of lysine by the -amino adipic acid (AAA) pathway.

Chytrids are saprobic, degrading refractory materials such as chitin and keratin, and sometimes act as parasites. There has been a significant increase in the research of chytrids since the discovery of Batrachochytrium dendrobatidis, the causal agent of chytridiomycosis.

Classification
Species of Chytridiomycota have traditionally been delineated and classified based on development, morphology, substrate, and method of zoöspore discharge. However, single spore isolates (or isogenic lines) display a great amount of variation in many of these features; thus, these features cannot be used to reliably classify or identify a species. Currently, taxonomy in Chytridiomycota is based on molecular data, zoöspore ultrastructure and some aspects of thallus morphology and development.

In an older and more restricted sense (not used here), the term "chytrids" referred just to those fungi in the class Chytridiomycetes. Here, the term "chytrid" refers to all members of Chytridiomycota.
 
The chytrids have also been included among the Protoctista, but are now regularly classed as fungi.

In older classifications, chytrids, except the recently established order Spizellomycetales, were placed in the class Phycomycetes under the subphylum Myxomycophyta of the kingdom Fungi. Previously, they were placed in the Mastigomycotina as the class Chytridiomycetes. The other classes of the Mastigomycotina, the Hyphochytriomycetes and oömycetes, were removed from the fungi to be classified as heterokont pseudofungi.

The class Chytridiomycetes has over 750 chytrid species distributed among ten orders. Additional classes include the Monoblepharidomycetes, with two orders, and the Hyaloraphidiomycetes with a single order.

Molecular phylogenetics, and other techniques such as ultrastructure analysis, has greatly increased the understanding of chytrid phylogeny, and led to the formation of several new zoösporic fungal phyla:

 The order Blastocladiales, originally within the Chytridiomycota, are now classified as a separate phylum, the Blastocladiomycota.
 The Neocallimastigales, originally an order of anaerobic fungi of the class Chytridiomycetes, found in the digestive tracts of herbivores, was later raised to a separate phylum, the Neocallimastigomycota.
 The Olpidiaceae, including the type genus Olpidium, formerly classified in the order Chytridiales, were raised to a separate phylum, the Olpidiomycota.

Life cycle and body plan
Chytridiomycota are unusual among the Fungi in that they reproduce with zoöspores. For most members of Chytridiomycota, sexual reproduction is not known. Asexual reproduction occurs through the release of zoöspores (presumably) derived through mitosis.

Where it has been described, sexual reproduction of chytrids occurs via a variety of methods. It is generally accepted that the resulting zygote forms a resting spore, which functions as a means of surviving adverse conditions. In some members, sexual reproduction is achieved through the fusion of isogametes (gametes of the same size and shape). This group includes the notable plant pathogens Synchytrium. Some algal parasites practice oögamy: A motile male gamete attaches itself to a nonmotile structure containing the female gamete. In another group, two thalli produce tubes that fuse and allow the gametes to meet and fuse. In the last group, rhizoids of compatible strains meet and fuse. Both nuclei migrate out of the zoösporangium and into the conjoined rhizoids where they fuse. The resulting zygote germinates into a resting spore.

Sexual reproduction is common and well known among members of the Monoblepharidomycetes. Typically, these chytrids practice a version of oögamy: The male is motile and the female is stationary. This is the first occurrence of oögamy in kingdom Fungi. Briefly, the monoblephs form oögonia, which give rise to eggs, and antheridia, which give rise to male gametes. Once fertilized, the zygote either becomes an encysted or motile oöspore, which ultimately becomes a resting spore that will later germinate and give rise to new zoösporangia.

Upon release from the germinated resting spore, zoöspores seek out a suitable substrate for growth using chemotaxis or phototaxis. Some species encyst and germinate directly upon the substrate; others encyst and germinate a short distance away. Once germinated, enzymes released from the zoöspore begin to break down the substrate and utilize it produce a new thallus. Thalli are coenocytic and usually form no true mycelium (having rhizoids instead).

Chytrids have several different growth patterns. Some are holocarpic, which means they only produce a zoösporangium and zoöspores. Others are eucarpic, meaning they produce other structures, such as rhizoids, in addition to the zoösporangium and zoöspores. Some chytrids are monocentric, meaning a single zoöspore gives rise to a single zoösporangium. Others are polycentric, meaning one zoöspore gives rise to many zooöporangium connected by a rhizomycelium. Rhizoids do not have nuclei while a rhizomycelium can.

Growth continues until a new batch of zoöspores are ready for release. Chytrids have a diverse set of release mechanisms that can be grouped into the broad categories of operculate or inoperculate. Operculate discharge involves the complete or incomplete detachment of a lid-like structure, called an operculum, allowing the zoöspores out of the sporangium. Inoperculate chytrids release their zoöspores through pores, slits, or papillae.

Habitats 
Chytrids are aquatic fungi, though those that thrive in the capillary network around soil particles are typically considered terrestrial. The zoöspore is primarily a means of thoroughly exploring a small volume of water for a suitable substrate rather than a means of long-range dispersal.

Chytrids have been isolated from a variety of aquatic habitats, including peats, bogs, rivers, ponds, springs, and ditches, and terrestrial habitats, such as acidic soils, alkaline soils, temperate forest soils, rainforest soils, Arctic and Antarctic soils. This has led to the belief that many chytrid species are ubiquitous and cosmopolitan. However, recent taxonomic work has demonstrated that this ubiquitous and cosmopolitan morphospecies hide cryptic diversity at the genetic and ultrastructural levels. It was first thought aquatic chytrids (and other zoösporic fungi) were primarily active in fall, winter, and spring. However, recent molecular inventories of lakes during the summer indicate that chytrids are an active, diverse part of the eukaryotic microbial community.

One of the least expected terrestrial environments the chytrid thrive in are periglacial soils. The population of the Chytridiomycota species are able to be supported even though there is a lack of plant life in these frozen regions due to the large amounts of water in periglacial soil and pollen blowing up from below the timberline.

Ecological functions

Batrachochytrium dendrobatidis

The chytrid Batrachochytrium dendrobatidis is responsible for chytridiomycosis, a disease of amphibians. Discovered in 1998 in Australia and Panama this disease is known to kill amphibians in large numbers, and has been suggested as a principal cause for the worldwide amphibian decline. Outbreaks of the fungus were found responsible for killing much of the Kihansi Spray Toad population in its native habitat of Tanzania, as well as the extinction of the golden toad in 1989. Chytridiomycosis has also been implicated in the presumed extinction of the Southern Gastric Brooding Frog, last seen in the wild in 1981, and the Northern Gastric Brooding Frog, last recorded in the wild in March 1985. The process leading to frog mortality is thought to be the loss of essential ions through pores made in the epidermal cells by the chytrid during its replication.

Recent research has revealed that elevating salt levels slightly may be able to cure chytridiomycosis in some Australian frog species, although further experimentation is needed.

Other parasites
Chytrids mainly infect algae and other eukaryotic and prokaryotic microbes. The infection can be so severe as to control primary production within the lake. It has been suggested that parasitic chytrids have a large effect on lake and pond food webs. Chytrids may also infect plant species; in particular, Synchytrium endobioticum is an important potato pathogen.

Saprobes
Arguably, the most important ecological function chytrids perform is decomposition. These ubiquitous and cosmopolitan organisms are responsible for decomposition of refractory materials, such as pollen, cellulose, chitin, and keratin. 
There are also chytrids that live and grow on pollen by attaching threadlike structures, called rhizoids, onto the pollen grains. This mostly occurs during asexual reproduction because the zoöspores that become attached to the pollen continuously reproduce and form new chytrids that will attach to other pollen grains for nutrients. This colonization of pollen happens during the spring time when bodies of water accumulate pollen falling from trees and plants.

Fossil record
The earliest fossils of chytrids are from the Scottish Rhynie chert, a Devonian-age lagerstätte with anatomical preservation of plants and fungi. Among the microfossils are chytrids preserved as parasites on rhyniophytes. These fossils closely resemble the modern genus Allomyces. Holocarpic chytrid remains were found in cherts from Combres in central France that date back to the late Visean. These remains were found along with eucarpic remains and are ambiguous in nature although they are thought to be of chytrids. Other chytrid-like fossils were found in cherts from the upper Pennsylvanian in the Saint-Etienne Basin in France, dating between 300~350 ma.

In fictional media
The novel Tom Clancy's Splinter Cell: Fallout (2007) features a species of chytrid that feeds on petroleum and oil-based products. In the story the species is modified using nuclear radiation, to increase the rate at which it feeds on oil. It is then used by Islamic extremists in an attempt to destroy the world's oil supplies, thereby taking away the technological advantage of the United States.

The webcomic Black Mudpuppy by Ethan Kocak features an arc with an evil, anthropomorphic chytrid developed as a Nazi experiment to infect Xolotl, a giant, talking black axolotl.

References

External links 

 

  — Includes links on how to isolate and culture chytrids.

 

 
 
 Chytrid fungus and how it impacts amphibians kept as domestic pets in the Aquarium Wiki Encyclopaedia.
 

 
Aquatic fungi
Fungus phyla
Fungi by classification